The 1940–41 Divizia A was the twenty-ninth season of Divizia A, the top-level football league of Romania.

Teams

League table

Notes
Carpaţi Baia Mare did not start in the new edition because of Second Vienna Award, and the city of Baia Mare was part of Hungary now.
Crișana Oradea the Winner of 1939–40 Divizia B was also under the Hungary occupation so the runner-up was promoted.
The new promoted FC Universitatea Cluj moved in Sibiu to can play in Divizia A under the name Universitatea Cluj-Sibiu, because Cluj-Napoca was under Hungary occupation.
CAM Timișoara and AMEF Arad was banned due to politic reasons, being workers teams.
FC Craiova and Gloria Arad was promoted to replace this 2 teams.
Also the Winner of 1939–40 Divizia B, Franco-Româna Brăila was banned being a worker team, so they was replaced by FC Brăila.

Results

Top goalscorers

Champion squad

See also 

 1940–41 Divizia B

References

Liga I seasons
Romania
1940–41 in Romanian football